Gorno Lisiče is a neighbourhood in the City of Skopje, North Macedonia, administered by the Aerodrom Municipality.

Demographics
According to the 2002 census, the town had a total of 18,233 inhabitants. Ethnic groups in the town include:

Macedonians 16,408
Albanians 721
Serbs 405 
Romani 357
Turks 93
Bosniaks 20 
Vlachs 98
Others 121

Sports
FK Gorno Lisiče is the local football club. The club competes in the Second Macedonian Football League. The club currently plays at the Cementarnica Stadium in Kisela Voda Municipality.

References

External links

Villages in Aerodrom Municipality, Skopje
Neighbourhoods of Skopje